Daisuke Inoue (13 September 1941 - 30 May 2000), whose stage name was Tadao Inoue, was a Japanese singer, composer, songwriter, and a musician proficient with multiple instruments.

Life and career 
Born in Tokyo, Inoue started his musical career in 1960 as a member of the group Jackey Yoshikawa and His Blue Comets, serving as multi-instrumentist, vocalist and often also as composer. Among others, he penned the group's major hit "Blue Chateau" (ブルー・シャトウ, "Burū shatō"), which won a Japan Record Award and sold over one million copies. After the group disbanded, Inoue started a career as a solo singer and as a composer for other artists, notably Finger 5 and Hiromi Go. In 1981 he adopted the stage name Daisuke Inoue to mark a fresh start to his career. Among his major hits is "Ai Senshi", the theme song of the Mobile Suit Gundam film trilogy. He also composed music for commercials, notably the popular tune "I Feel Coke" for a series of 1980s-1990s Coca-Cola commercials. 

Suffering from a retinal detachment that was not resolved by a recent surgery, and with his wife seriously ill, Inoue committed suicide by hanging on 30 May 2000, at the age of 58. His wife hanged herself one year later.

References

External links 

1941 births
2000 deaths
People from Tokyo
Japanese male singers 
Japanese male composers
Suicides by hanging in Japan
2000 suicides